Call Me Papa Jack is a Filipino talk show that airs on TV5. It premiered on January 24, 2015 and is hosted by John S. Gemperle (a.k.a. Papa Jack of 90.7 Love Radio). It airs every Sunday at 10:00pm (PST) after Wow Mali Lakas ng Tama.

Show format 
Gemperle evaluates relationship concerns and offers love advice. He also interviews celebrities. Previous guests include Julia Clarete, Bianca King and Bret Jackson.

See also 
 List of programs broadcast by TV5 (Philippine TV network)

References

External links 
 

TV5 (Philippine TV network) original programming
Philippine television talk shows
2015 Philippine television series debuts
2015 Philippine television series endings
Filipino-language television shows